Hirvi (also Romanized as Hīrvī and Ḩīrvī; also known as Harveh, Harvī, Haweri, Heravī, Hervī, Hīrāvī, and Hirawi) is a village in Howli Rural District, in the Central District of Paveh County, Kermanshah Province, Iran. At the 2006 census, its population was 125, in 33 families.

References 

Populated places in Paveh County